Lee Hardcastle is a British clay animator.

Life and career
Hardcastle studied at the Northern Film School of Leeds Beckett University and started to release clay animations on YouTube in the mid-2000s. Hardcastle was selected as the 26th director of the 2011 film The ABCs of Death, to which he contributed the animated short T is for Toilet. He directed and animated the music video for the Kill the Noise song "Blvck Mvgic (Kill the Noise Pt. 2)". In 2012, Hardcastle released the animated short Pingu's The Thing to YouTube, a mashup of animation series Pingu and horror movie The Thing that quickly became viral on the platform and for which he was praised by The Thing director John Carpenter. The video was subsequently removed from Hardcastle's YouTube channel at the request of Pingu owners HIT Entertainment, to which Hardcastle reacted by uploading a shot-by-shot recreation of the video entitled Claycat's The Thing, featuring cats instead of penguins. Hardcastle lists the works of filmmakers Quentin Tarantino, Robert Rodriguez, and Sam Raimi, as well as animated series The Simpsons and Family Guy as major influences.

References

External links

1985 births
English animators
British animated film directors
Horror film directors
People from Leeds
Living people
Clay animators
Horror animation
Stop motion animators
YouTube controversies
Animation controversies
English YouTubers
YouTube channels launched in 2006
YouTube animators
Online obscenity controversies
Obscenity controversies in animation
Internet-related controversies
Obscenity controversies